General George Warde (24 November 1725 – 11 March 1803) was a British Army officer. The second son of Colonel John Warde of Squerryes Court in Westerham, and Miss Frances Bristow of Micheldever. He was a close childhood friend of James Wolfe, the Conqueror of Quebec. He became a colonel in the Royal Horse Guards. (2 April 1778 Colonel of the 1st Regiment of Horse). In 1773 he became colonel of the 14th Dragoons, then in 1791 was appointed Commander-in-Chief, Ireland, a post which earned him the rank of general in 1796.

He died in 1803 and is buried at St Mary Abchurch in London.

References
Additional reading:

 John Warde: https://genealogy.links.org/links-cgi/readged?/home/ben/camilla-genealogy/current+%210%3a192821+3-5-0-1-0
 Francis Bristow: https://genealogy.links.org/links-cgi/readged?/home/ben/camilla-genealogy/current+%210%3A192828+3-5-0-1-0
 James Wolfe and George Warde: https://archive.org/details/lifelettersofja00willuoft/page/9/mode/1up

1725 births
1803 deaths
British Army generals
Commanders-in-Chief, Ireland
Members of the Privy Council of Ireland
4th Royal Irish Dragoon Guards officers
14th King's Hussars officers
Royal Horse Guards officers